Peringottukurissi-II is a village in the Palakkad district, state of Kerala, India. It is among the villages administered by the Peringottukurissi gram panchayat.

Demographics
 India census, Peringottukurissi-II had a population of 11,702 with 5,552 males and 6,150 females.

References

Peringottukurissi-II